Doryichthys martensii (longsnouted pipefish) is a species of freshwater, benthopelagic, fish of the family Syngnathidae. It is found in Indonesia, Malaysia, Brunei Darussalam, and Thailand. This species is ovoviviparous, with males carrying eggs and giving birth to live young.

References

Further reading

Encyclopedia of Life

martensii
Marine fish
Fish described in 1868
Taxa named by Wilhelm Peters